This is the complete list of Olympic medalists in rhythmic gymnastics.

Rhythmic gymnastics

Current program

All-around, individual

All-around, group

Medal table

References

 International Olympic Committee results database

Rhythmic gymnastics
Olympic medalists
Gymnastics

Lists of medalists in gymnastics